National Route 315 is a national highway of Japan connecting Shūnan and Hagi in Yamaguchi prefecture, with a total length of 88.9 km (55.24 mi).

References

National highways in Japan
Roads in Yamaguchi Prefecture